The Extraordinary and Plenipotentiary Ambassador of Peru to the Russian Federation is the official representative of the Republic of Peru to the Russian Federation.

Diplomatic relations between Peru and Russia date back to the 19th century. Emperor Alexander II sent a letter, dated 29 October 1862, to Miguel de San Román, president of Peru, congratulating him on his election and expressing his desire to maintain friendly relations between the Russian Empire and Peru. The two countries signed their first official document, a Trade and Navigation Agreement in 1874, and by 1909 Peru had six consular missions in the Russian Empire: in Saint Petersburg, Moscow, Riga, Warsaw, Odessa and Kherson.

With the execution of the Romanov family and the downfall of the Russian Republic as a result of the Russian Civil War, both countries ceased to have any diplomatic relations from 1918 until the second half of the 20th century.

Relations at the embassy level between the Soviet Union and Peru were established on 1 February 1969. Relations were strengthened after the 1970 Ancash earthquake, with the Soviet Union sending helicopters and medical aid. With the dissolution of the Soviet Union in 1991, Peru recognised the Russian Federation as its successor state on 26 December 1991.

List of representatives

Russian Empire (1874–1918)

Soviet Union (1969–1991)

Russian Federation (1991–present)

See also
List of ambassadors of Russia to Peru
List of ambassadors of Peru to Czechoslovakia
List of ambassadors of Peru to East Germany
List of ambassadors of Peru to Yugoslavia
List of ambassadors of Peru to Bulgaria
List of ambassadors of Peru to Albania
List of ambassadors of Peru to Hungary
List of ambassadors of Peru to Romania
List of ambassadors of Peru to Poland

References

Russia
Peru
Peruvian diplomats
Ambassadors of Peru